The United States men's national squash team represents the United States in international squash team competitions, and is governed by U.S. Squash.

Since 1973, the United States has participated in two quarter finals of the World Squash Team Open.

Current team
 Todd Harrity
 Christopher Gordon
 Chris Hanson
 Faraz Khan
 Andrew Douglas
 Spencer Lovejoy
 Timmy Brownell
 Sam Scherl

Results

World Team Squash Championships

References

See also 
 U.S. Squash
 World Team Squash Championships
 United States women's national squash team

Squash teams
Men's national squash teams
Squash
Squash in the United States